Manori is a village located on Dharavi Bet in northern Mumbai, India. It is known for its beach and the Manori Creek.

Transportation
 Manori can be reached by road via Bhayander, Dahisar Check naka. 
 The sea route, however, is relatively shorter. Manori is a 15 minute ferry ride away from Marve Beach in Malad.
 The closest railway station is Malad.

Local population
Manori is dominated by the local fishing & farming community. Fishing and farming are the major occupations among the locals. The village is divided into  3 sections i.e. Koliwada, Bhandarwada and Panchghar. Koliwada being the most populated and congested compared to other sections. The largest bungalow in the village, "Green Villa", belongs to Stephen & Francis Ferreira now and is also known as "Motha Ghar" & the largest family in the village is "Sodawala Family".

Tourism
Manori is a very popular weekend destination among the people of Mumbai. The beach, roads, and overall culture are similar to Goa, providing a mini-Goa experience within the city of Mumbai. Apart from beachside shacks, there are two resorts in Manori designed like Spanish villas.

Manori has numerous hotels and cottages, as many picnickers visit daily; the village beaches and resorts are crowded.

It is a popular destination for city-dwellers escaping the stressful city environment. There are food stands that serve Indo-Chinese and East Indian food and seafood. Some of the popular dishes are Pork vindaloo and sorpotel, chicken raan, stuffed pomfret, dry Bombay duck chutney, rotis, prawns chilly fry, and fried bombay duck. Delicious beef dishes can also be found without much effort.

Manori is also very popular among cyclists of Mumbai who go to Manori and its surrounding islands like Gorai, Uttan, etc.

Hotels in Manori

 Domonica Beach Resort
 Manoribel Resort

Places of religious attraction
For religious/spiritual visitors, the Global Vipassana Pagoda, the world's largest structure containing the bone relics of the Buddha, offers a scenic view. There are two ashrams of the spiritual masters of Nath Sampradaya - Swami Gagangiri Maharaj and his disciple Swami Gagananand Maharaj. There is a Shiva temple (Samudreshwar) located at the jetty of Manori.

Future plans
With new MMRDA plans for a tourism zone for Manori, Culvem, Gorai and Uttan, it is likely that these areas are going to be converted into picnic and recreation destinations. Out of all the villages in the Gorai Manori Uttan Development Plan, most of the tourism zone is allotted to Manori Village.  Some agricultural lands will be converted into a "green zone" where farm houses, bungalows, swimming pools, etc. may be constructed. Since the MMRDA drafts were released, the local real estate is in great demand. The value of properties is increasing and investors from Mumbai are buying plots.

References

Neighbourhoods in Mumbai
Villages in Mumbai Suburban district